Events in the year 1901 in Colombia.

Incumbents
President: José Manuel Marroquín
Minister of War: José Domingo Ospina until March 28, Ramón González Valencia to July 11, Pedro Nel Ospina to September 4, José Vicente Concha

Events
January – Liberal General Benjamin Herrera accompanied by Belisario Porras and Victoriano Lorenzo arrived in the city of Aguadulce (now Aguadulce, Panama) and demanded the surrender of the Conservative forces defending the city. The Conservative army refused.
February 23 – August 27 – Battle of Aguadulce
June – Conservative government sent a much larger force to recapture the city. This operation was much more properly planned than the earlier defense of the city. The planned involved on a force, led by General Luis Morales Berti, to advance from the locality of Anton towards Aguadulce, while the other, led by General Francisco Castro, to advance from the west and to complete the pincer. However, General Castro preferred to move on Anton and to unite his forces with those of General Berti. This error was taken advantage of by the Liberal forces, who used the extra time to escape

Births

Deaths
January 9 – Santos Acosta

1900s in Colombia